Valeri Klementiev (died 1971) was an international speedway rider from the Soviet Union.

Speedway career 
Klementiev became a European Champion, after winning the gold medal at the 1969 European Final. He also reached the final of the Speedway World Championship in the 1969 Individual Speedway World Championship. He was killed at a young age during a race in May 1971 in Russia.

World final appearances

Individual World Championship
 1969 –  London, Wembley Stadium – 13th – 4pts
 1970 -  Wroclaw, Olympic Stadium - 6th - 8pts

World Team Cup
 1969 -  Rybnik, Rybnik Municipal Stadium (with Viktor Trofimov / Vladimir Smirnov / Gennady Kurilenko / Yury Dubinin) - 3rd - 23pts (5)

See also
Rider deaths in motorcycle racing

References 

1971 deaths
Year of birth missing
Russian speedway riders